Lethabo Mphela (born 1 January 1998) was a South African former soccer player who plays as a midfielder for Kaizer Chiefs.

References

1998 births
Living people
South African soccer players
Association football defenders
Kaizer Chiefs F.C. players
South African Premier Division players
2019 Africa U-23 Cup of Nations players